Bacillus lentimorbus is a Gram-positive bacterium used as a soil or plant inoculant in agriculture and horticulture.  It is the causative agent of Milky disease in some scarab beetle larvae.

See also
Bacillus oleronius
Bacillus pumilus
Bacillus marinus

References

Further reading

lentimorbus